Oor Panchayathu is 1992 Indian Tamil-language film written and directed by Mahendran. The film stars Pandiarajan and Mahalakshmi. It was released on 29 May 1992.

Plot 
Siva is the foster son of a respectable village elder. The village elder wishes to get his granddaughter married to Siva. But Siva incurs the wrath of the village elder's son-in-law when the villagers unanimously elect him head of the village panchayat. The anger turns into suspicion when Siva gives shelter to a woman named Thamarai and her new-born baby. Siva's kindness is misinterpreted, and even his lover shuns him. The wrinkles in the relationship get ironed out when Thamarai's husband returns to take his wife and child away. But the rift between Siva and the son-in-law widens and culminates in murder.

Cast
Pandiarajan as Siva
Mahalakshmi
V. K. Ramasamy as the village elder
Sulakshana as Thamarai

Production 
Oor Panchayathu was directed by Mahendran, who also wrote the screenplay.

Soundtrack 
The music was composed by S. P. Balasubrahmanyam.

Release and reception 
Oor Panchayathu was released on 29 May 1992. RSP of The Indian Express derided the film, saying, "Mahendran who has handled the screen play, dialogue and direction does not seem to have applied his skills. He has miserably failed to make the narration interesting."

References

External links 
 

1990s Tamil-language films
1992 drama films
Films directed by Mahendran (filmmaker)
Films scored by S. P. Balasubrahmanyam
Films with screenplays by Mahendran (filmmaker)
Indian drama films